Turbat Tehsil is an administrative subdivision (tehsil) of Kech District in the Balochistan province of Pakistan. The tehsil is administratively subdivided into seventeen Union Councils and is headquartered in the city of Turbat.

References

Tehsils of Balochistan, Pakistan
Kech District